Phones 4u was a large independent mobile phone retailer in the United Kingdom. It was part of the 4u Group based in Newcastle-under-Lyme, Staffordshire. Opening in 1996, it expanded to over 600 stores. On 14 September 2014, EE and Vodafone, the company's final remaining suppliers, ended their contracts.

The company entered administration on 15 September 2014 with PricewaterhouseCoopers appointed as administrators.

History
In 1987, John Caudwell and his brother Brian founded Midlands Mobile Phones, a wholesaler and distributor of mobile phones. The company became the Caudwell Group, whose high street retail arm was named Phones 4u.

On 26 September 2006, The Caudwell Group was sold for a sum of £1.47 billion to private equity firms Providence Equity Partners and Doughty Hanson & Co. In February 2008, the group bought online retailer Dialaphone in a deal worth an estimated £9 million.

In July 2010, Phones 4u partnered with electrical chain Dixons to place 49 concessions inside Currys and PC World stores. This number increased to over one hundred. However, following a merger between Dixons and rival phone shop, Carphone Warehouse, it was announced that this partnership would not be renewed.

The group was acquired by private equity group BC Partners in March 2011. The deal, estimated to be worth in the region of £700 million, was agreed several months after talks with a United States private equity owner ended. In April 2012, Phones 4u's contract with provider Three was terminated. In January 2014, O2 ended their contract with Phones 4u.

On 15 September 2014, Phones 4u entered administration, after the two remaining suppliers EE and Vodafone terminated their contracts. Stores closed, and both the Phones 4u and Dial-A-Phone websites were taken offline, pending a decision by the administrators.

On 19 September 2014, Vodafone reached an agreement with the administrators of Phones 4u to take over and rebrand 140 stores. It was also revealed that 628 employees at the head office in Newcastle-Under-Lyme would be laid off.

On 22 September 2014, EE reached an agreement with Phones 4u's administrators to take over and rebrand 58 stores, while Dixons Carphone revealed that they would transfer 800 employees to its Currys and PC World stores.

On 23 September 2014, administrators PwC announced that close to 1,700 jobs would be lost.

On 14 October 2014, EE announced that it would acquire mobile virtual network operator Life Mobile from Phones 4u's administrators.

The 4u Group consisted of the following entities:

 Phones 4u Limited — high street and online retailer
 Life Mobile Limited — a mobile virtual network operator, running on EE
 Dial-a-Phone — online retailer
 Policy Administration Services — mobile phone insurance provider
 4u Wi-Fi Limited
 Jump 4u Limited
 MobileServ Limited
 Phosphorus Acquisition Limited
 Phones 4u Group Limited
 Phones 4u Finance plc

Products
Phones 4u operated both in store and online and sold feature phones and smartphones from all major manufacturers on both contract agreements and pay as you go tariffs. Until September 2014, these were available on all major network providers in the United Kingdom, with the exception of Three, who ceased working with Phones 4u in April 2012.

Aside from handsets, Phones 4u stocked mobile phone accessories and tablet computer devices. 'JUMP' (Just Update My Phone) and 4u Wifi were introduced to accompany the "mobile lifestyle" and support the core products.

Insurance was available on many of its products from the financial arm of the 4u Group, Policy Administration Services. In November 2012, Phones 4u changed their insurance policy from PremierPlan to Phones 4u Care, which offers customers an instant replacement in-store or similar alternative at the current handset value (not the purchase value); rather than waiting for their device to be repaired or replaced.

Sales and service
Before 2008, complaints surfaced about shoppers feeling pressured by hard sell tactics for phone insurance, negative service perceptions and high staff turnover. The retailer retrained staff and eliminated some of its more aggressive practices, including street-fighting, the practice of sales people standing in shop doorways to lure customers.

In November 2008, Ofcom found Phones 4u guilty of misleading customers over network coverage, failing to swiftly provide refunds for faulty handsets and offering unfair terms on chequeback schemes. Phones 4u responded with a series of undertakings to prevent recurrences. The company said 80% of complaints were due to problems in its repair business, rather than sales, which the company was in the process of resolving.

After six months of scrutiny, the Ofcom investigation resulted in minor changes to terms and conditions. Phones 4u subsequently changed its repair provider.

Turnover for the mobile phone retailer grew 22% in 2010, rising from £746m to £911m. The group employed over 8,000 people worldwide and sold 26 phones every minute. In November 2011 it was reported that despite the company's turnover having increased, the rising cost of providing insurance with smartphones had contributed to a 25% loss of earnings.

Advertising and sponsorship
Phones 4u was noted for its effective and controversial advertising campaigns.

A shirt sponsorship deal was agreed with Birmingham City F.C. for two seasons, beginning in August 2001.

In 2004, the comedy duo Flight of the Conchords featured in a television advert driving up and down Britain singing about the latest offers.

Phones 4u's campaign of 2006 starred a variety of eccentric characters, including "Jack" and "Scary Mary", who needed help with their mobile phones. The adverts were often set at the British seaside and featured the Phones 4u hand gesture for the first time, which would be revived for later campaigns.

In the summer of 2009, Phones 4u and communications agency Adam & Eve launched a new advertising campaign based around social networking, popularity called "Great Deals for Popular People". The theme around the campaign was that the customer needs to have 50 contacts on their phone to get Phones 4u's best deals. In one of the ads, a scout master was displayed with the caption "You may be good with knots, you may be good with children, but there's no way you've got 50 friends on your phone", along with a large "NO" sticker. The campaign met criticism from The Scout Association, and the advert was pulled.

In May 2010, it launched the "It's What We Do" campaign. Television adverts showed Bangkok prison guards getting accustomed to a new handset.

In September 2011, the Advertising Standards Authority banned a Phones 4u advert depicting Buddy Christ alongside a range of Android phones with the message "Miraculous deals on Samsung Galaxy Android phones".

The ASA said "although the ads were intended to be light hearted and humorous, their depiction of Jesus winking and holding a thumbs up sign, with the text 'miraculous' deals during Easter, the Christian Holy Week which celebrated Christ's resurrection, gave the impression that they were mocking and belittling core Christian beliefs."

Later in October 2011, Phones 4u switched its advertising focus to a broader demographic, spending £5.2m on a horror themed price led promotion called "Missing Our Deals Will Haunt You". The campaign included two television advertisements: one taking inspiration from horror movies, featuring a young girl; with the other making a play on the classic zombie genre.

The former advertisement received the most complaints filed with the ASA for any advert in 2011, however the complaints were rejected by the ASA who said "The programmes the advert was screened around were unlikely to be viewed by children."

Phones 4u backed its advertising campaigns with television programme sponsorships, including Hollyoaks and Harry Hill's TV Burp. On 31 July 2013, it was announced that Phones 4u had secured a five year sponsorship deal with the Manchester Arena, renaming the arena as the Phones 4u Arena. In July 2014, it launched the "#FutureYou" campaign. Television adverts featured the DeLorean time machine famous from the Back to the Future films.

References

External links
 

1996 establishments in the United Kingdom
British companies established in 1996
Retail companies established in 1996
Telecommunications companies established in 1996
Retail companies disestablished in 2014
British companies disestablished in 2014
Companies that have entered administration in the United Kingdom
Mobile phone companies of the United Kingdom
Newcastle-under-Lyme
Private equity portfolio companies